Comer's Midden was a 1916 archaeological excavation site near Thule (modern Qaanaaq), north of Mt. Dundas in North Star Bay in northern Greenland. It is the find after which the Thule culture was named. The site was first excavated in 1916 by whaling Captain George Comer, ice master of the Crocker Land Expedition's relief team, and of members of Knud Rasmussen's Second Danish Thule Expedition who were in the area charting the North Greenland coast.

Excavation phases 
1916
With his ship ice-bound, Comer made use of his time through an archaeological excavation just south of Arctic Station of Thule unearthing, amongst other things, a kitchen-midden made by paleo-Eskimos. The site is named in honor of Comer and the midden that he found.

1920s
Anthropologist Therkel Mathiassen accompanied Rasmussen's 5th Thule Expedition (1921–1924) that included a return to the Thule site.  In Mathiasen's monumental works of the 1920s and 1930s, he described Comer's Midden as "the only substantial find of pure Thule culture in Greenland".

1930s and 1940s
The site was excavated by Erik Holtved in 1935 to 1937, and again in 1946 to 1947.

Archaeological finds 

Habitation periods
The site shows signs of having been inhabited from the 14th to the 20th century although Holtved reports that the 17th and 18th centuries are poorly represented.

Ruins
One house was rectangular , with narrow platforms along two of the walls, was probably a "qassi" or "men's house" and was probably used as a workshop and for social gatherings.

Artifacts
Subsequent to the initial finds, additional artifacts pertain to the Dorset culture, as well as items of Norse origin.

The vast majority of harpoon heads found are of the open socket type typical of the Thule culture.

Re-settlement 

In 1910, Rasmussen and Peter Freuchen established a private trading post as Cape York and a settlement area named Uummannaq was established near it by local Inuit, although it was known as Dundas in English. In 1953, Dundas and nearby Pituffik were converted into Thule Air Force Base and their residents relocated to Qaanaaq.

Notes

References

Birket-Smith, Kaj (1925). "Physical Anthropology, Linguistics, and Material Culture" in Rasmussen, Knud; Birket-Smith, Kaj; Mathiassen, Therkel; Freuchen, Peter The Danish Ethnographic and Geographic Expedition to Arctic America. Preliminary Report of the Fifth Thule Expedition. Geographical Review, vol. 15, no. 4, pp. 535–49. American Geographical Society.

Gulløv, Hans Christian (2004). "Nunarput, vort land. Thulekulturen."  in Gulløv, Hans Christian (ed.) Grønlands forhistorie. Gyldendal. .
Holtved, Erik (1944). Archaeological Investigations in the Thule District, vol I. Descriptive part. Meddelelser om Grønland, vol. 141, no. 1. Copenhagen: C. A. Reitzel.
Holtved, Erik (1944). Archaeological Investigations in the Thule District, vol II. Analytical part. Meddelelser om Grønland, vol. 141, no. 2. Copenhagen: C. A. Reitzel.
Holtved, Erik (1954). Archaeological Investigations in the Thule District, vol III. Nûgdlît and Comer's Midden. Meddelelser om Grønland, vol. 146, no. 3. Copenhagen: C. A. Reitzel.
Mathiassen, Therkel (1935). Eskimo Migrations in Greenland. Geographical Review, vol. 25, no. 3, pp. 408–22. American Geographical Society.
Meldgaard, Jørgen (1996). "The Pioneers: The Beginnings of Paleo-Eskimo Research in West Greenland" in Grønnow, Bjarne; Pind, John (eds.) The Paleo-Eskimo Cultures of Greenland – New Perspectives in Greenlandic Archaeology. Copenhagen: Danish Polar Center. .
Rasmussen, Knud (1919). The Second Thule Expedition to Northern Greenland, 1916–1918. Geographical Review, vol. 8, no. 2, pp. 116–25. American Geographical Society.

Wissler, Clark (1918). Archaeology of the Polar Eskimo. Anthropological Papers of the American Museum of Natural History, vol. 22, part 3, pp. 105–66.

Populated places established in the 14th century
Archaeological sites in Greenland
Inuit history
Prehistory of the Arctic
Former populated places in Greenland